The Manhattan Beach Botanical Garden is a botanical garden located within Polliwog Park in Manhattan Beach, California. It is open daily with free admission. The garden was first envisioned in 1992, with garden construction starting in 1994. In 1997 the garden became a nonprofit organization, and its grand opening was on Earth Day 2001. It consists primarily of plants native to California.

References

See also 
 South Coast Botanic Garden
 Santa Barbara Botanic Garden
 California Botanic Garden
 Mildred E. Mathias Botanical Garden

 

Botanical gardens in California
Manhattan Beach, California